Alexander Nilsson (born 22 August 1997) is a Swedish football goalkeeper who plays for Helsingborgs IF.

References

1997 births
Living people
Swedish footballers
Association football goalkeepers
Helsingborgs IF players
IFK Hässleholm players
Allsvenskan players